Clinton Village Village Historic District is a national historic district located at Clinton in Oneida County, New York. The district includes 144 contributing buildings, two contributing structures, two contributing sites, and six contributing objects.

It includes the Clinton Historical Society, a former church building.

It was listed on the National Register of Historic Places in 1982.

References

Historic districts on the National Register of Historic Places in New York (state)
Historic districts in Oneida County, New York
National Register of Historic Places in Oneida County, New York
Clinton (village), New York